The 1938 Coppa Italia Final was the final of the 1937–38 Coppa Italia. The match was played over two legs on 1 and 8 May 1938 between Torino and Juventus. Both teams had their stadiums, so the original final in Turin was divided into a two-legged match. Juventus won 5–2 on aggregate.

First leg

Second leg

References
Coppa Italia 1937/38 statistics at rsssf.com
 https://www.calcio.com/calendario/ita-coppa-italia-1937-1938-finale/2/
 https://www.worldfootball.net/schedule/ita-coppa-italia-1937-1938-finale/2/

Coppa Italia Finals
Coppa Italia Final 1938
Coppa Italia Final 1938